The Mark 41 Vertical Launching System (Mk 41 VLS) is a shipborne missile canister launching system which provides a rapid-fire launch capability against hostile threats. The Vertical Launch System (VLS) concept was derived from work on the Aegis Combat System.

History
Refinement of the initial concept of Aegis system in the 1960s continued through the 1960s and 1970s, and the Mk 41 was conceived in 1976. Originally, the system was only intended to fire the RIM-66 Standard missile, but the height of the Mk 41 was increased to accommodate the larger Tomahawk missile. The prototype for the launcher was tested and evaluated on board . The first operational launcher was installed aboard .

Specifications

Mark 41 (Mk 41)
The Mk 41 is capable of firing the following missiles: 

 RIM-66 Standard
 RIM-67 Standard
 RIM-161 Standard Missile 3
 RIM-174 Standard ERAM
 RGM-109 Tomahawk
 RUM-139 VL-ASROC anti-submarine missile
 RIM-7 Sea Sparrow anti-air missile
 RIM-162 ESSM
 Joint Strike Missile 

The missiles are pre-loaded into "canisters", which are then loaded into the individual "cells" of the launcher. The ESSM is loaded in a quad-pack with 4 missiles in one Mk 25 canister, older types of 8 cell modules are not able to use ESSM. Launcher cells are fitted to ships in 8 cell modules (2 rows of 4) that share a common uptake hatch (exhaust system) sited between the two rows. The Mk 41 VLS adopts modular design concept, which result in different versions that vary in size and weight due to different "canisters" in various modules. Ticonderoga cruisers and Arleigh Burke destroyers up to DDG-78 have a Strikedown module fore and aft, which consists of five cells and a collapsible crane for assisting with replenishment at sea. As replenishment of large missiles at sea was later seen as impractical and dangerous, Strikedown modules fell out of use on newer ships.

Mark 56 (Mk 56) VLS and Mark 57 (Mk 57) PVLS
 

The Mk 56 VLS is an evolution of the tactical length Mk 41 VLS which is a smaller version of the strike length Mk 41 used on Arleigh Burke-class destroyers. 

The Mk 57 Peripheral Vertical Launch System (PVLS) used on the Zumwalt-class destroyers is composed of much larger VLS cells capable of venting much larger volume and mass of exhaust gasses (mass flow rate), but is an evolution of the smaller unarmored Mk 56 VLS. The Mk 57 PVLS are designed to be installed on the ship periphery with armor on the inboard boundary, instead of in centralized magazines used in the Mk 41. 

Developed by Raytheon, Mk 57 provides backwards compatibility with existing missiles while allowing new missiles with significantly increased propulsion and payloads.  While allowing for larger missiles than the Mk 41, the primary improvement of Mk 57 is its exhaust gas management system which can accommodate new missile designs having up to 45 percent greater rocket motor mass flow rate than that of Mk 41. The unique symmetric geometry of the U-shaped gas management system facilitates the egress of gases, while minimizing flow into adjacent cells and reversed flow into the active cell. Another advantage is the elimination of the water deluge system, which is used to cool the missile canister in the event that the missile restraint bolts do not release after rocket motor ignition.  Elimination of the water deluge system significantly reduces maintenance and personnel requirements, and protects against accidental missile wet-down.

Variants

MK 41 Mod 0, s, two 61 cell Vertical Launcher Mk 158 Mod 0 or Mod 1, forward and aft.
MK 41 Mod 1, s, 61 cells forward.
MK 41 Mod 2, s, DDG-51 to DDG-78, one 29 cell Vertical Launcher Mk 159 Mod 0 forward, one 61 cell Vertical Launcher Mk 158 Mod 0 aft.
MK 41 Mod 3, s (Germany), 16 cells.
MK 41 Mod 5, s (Australia, New Zealand), 8 cells
MK 41 Mod 7, Arleigh Burke-class destroyers, DDG-79 to DDG-91, one 32 cell Vertical Launcher Mk 177 Mod 0 forward, one 64 cell Vertical Launcher Mk 176 Mod 0 aft.
MK 41 Mod 8, s (Turkey), 8 or 16 cells
MK 41 Mod 9, s (Netherlands), 40 cells 
MK 41 Mod 10, s (Germany), 32 cells
MK 41 Mod 15, Arleigh Burke-class destroyers, DDG-92 and up, one 32 cell Vertical Launcher Mk 177 Mod 3 forward, one 64 cell Vertical Launcher Mk 176 Mod 2 aft.
MK 41 Mod 16, s (Australia), 8 cells

Operators

 Adelaide-class frigate - (8 cells) (Retired)
Anzac-class frigate - (8 cells)
  - (48 cells)
  - (32 cells)

  - (29 cells) (Retired)
 Canadian Surface Combatant - (24 cells)

  - (8 cells)

  - (32 cells)

  - (8 or 16 cells)

 Sachsen-class frigate - (32 cells)
 Brandenburg-class frigate - (16 cells)

  - (96 cells)
  - (96 cells)
  - (90 cells)
  - (16 cells)
  - (16 cells)
  - (32 cells)
  - (32 cells)
  - (32 cells)
  - (16 cells)
  - (8 cells)

 De Zeven Provinciën-class frigate - (40 cells)

  - (8 or 16 cells)

  (KDX-II) - (32 cells)
  (KDX-III) - (80 cells)

  - (48 cells)

 Kaohsiung-class tank landing ship - (Test ship)

 Naresuan-class frigate - (8 cells)
 Bhumibol Adulyadej-class frigate - (8 cells)

  - (8 cells)
 Barbaros-class frigate - (16 cells)

Type 26 frigate - (24 cells)
Type 31 frigate - (to define) 

 Spruance-class destroyer - (61 cells, installed on 24 of 31 vessels) (Retired)
 Arleigh Burke-class destroyer - (90 or 96 cells)
 Ticonderoga-class cruiser - (122 cells)
  - (80 Mk 57 cells) 
 DDG(X) class destroyer - (At minimum up to 128 cells (4x32 module configuration), dependent on number of hypersonic missiles carried as per current US Navy design proposal)

Gallery

See also
 French Sylver
 Chinese GJB 5860-2006
 Russian Redut

References

External links 

FAS - Mk 41
Lockheed Martin - Mk 41 VLS Factsheet

Naval guided missile launch systems of the United States
Military equipment introduced in the 1980s